Robert Smith (born 1 February 1982) was an English cricketer. He was a left-handed batsman who played for Cumberland.

Smith made a single List A appearance for the team, in the Cheltenham & Gloucester Trophy in August 2001. He scored 3 runs in his innings, as opponents Warwickshire CB won by a narrow margin, thanks mostly to a century from Jim Troughton.

References
Robert Smith at Cricket Archive

1982 births
Living people
English cricketers
Cumberland cricketers